Bernau bei Berlin (in German Bahnhof Bernau bei Berlin, simply known as Bernau) is a railway station in the city of Bernau bei Berlin, Germany. It is served by the Berlin S-Bahn, several RegionalBahn trains and numerous local bus lines.

Train services
The station is served by the following service(s):

Intercity service (IC 50) Frankfurt (Main) - Erfurt - Halle - Berlin - Eberswalde - Stralsund - Binz
Regional services  Stralsund - Greifswald - Pasewalk - Angermünde - Berlin - Ludwigsfelde - Jüterbog - Falkenberg - Elsterwerda
Regional services  Schwedt - Angermünde - Berlin - Ludwigsfelde - Jüterbog - Lutherstadt Wittenberg
Local services  BER Airport - Terminal 1-2 - Berlin - Bernau - Eberswalde
Local services  Berlin - Bernau - Eberswalde - Angermunde - Szczecin
Berlin S-Bahn services  Bernau - Karow - Pankow - Gesundbrunnen - Friedrichstraße - Potsdamer Platz - Sudkreuz - Blankenfelde

References

External links

 Station information

Berlin S-Bahn stations
Railway stations in Brandenburg
Buildings and structures in Barnim
Railway stations in Germany opened in 1842
1842 establishments in Prussia